Puerto America Airport  is an airport serving the Madre de Dios River village of Puerto America in the Pando Department of Bolivia. The runway extends north from the village.

See also

Transport in Bolivia
List of airports in Bolivia

References

External links
OpenStreetMap - Puerto America

Airports in Pando Department